Nir Abergil (born 12 September 1990) is an Israeli footballer who plays as a forward for Israeli club Ironi Tiberias. Before joining Iksal in 2019, he had previously been contracted to Hapoel Ironi Baqa al-Gharbiyye.

References

External links
 

1990 births
Living people
Israeli footballers
Footballers from Kiryat Ata
Association football forwards
Hapoel Haifa F.C. players
Maccabi Ironi Kiryat Ata F.C. players
Hapoel Herzliya F.C. players
Ironi Tiberias F.C. players
Maccabi Netanya F.C. players
Ironi Nesher F.C. players
Hapoel Nir Ramat HaSharon F.C. players
Hapoel Iksal F.C. players
Hapoel Ironi Baqa al-Gharbiyye F.C. players
Hapoel Ra'anana A.F.C. players
Israeli Premier League players
Liga Leumit players